A connoisseur is a person who has expert knowledge in matters of taste or the fine arts.

Connoisseur may also refer to:

In arts and media:
 Connoisseur Media, a US radio station holding company
 The Connoisseur (magazine), a periodical on fine art, collectables and antique furniture founded in 1901, closed in 1992
 The Connoisseur (newspaper), a London weekly 18th century newspaper
 The Connoisseur, a 1962 work by Norman Rockwell
 Connoisseur Society, a US audiophile classical and music jazz record label

Other uses:
 Connoisseur (Hi-Fi), a British manufacturer of Hi-Fi equipment
 Connoisseur Grammar School, a private school in Pakistan
 Connoisseur's Bakery, a bakery company in Northern Ireland
 The Connoisseur car, a long-distance passenger railway carriage
 Rover 75 Connoisseur, a British luxury motor car